"King Midas in Reverse" is a song by English pop group the Hollies, written by Graham Nash but credited to Allan Clarke, Nash and Tony Hicks. It was released as a single in September 1967 in anticipation of the band's album Butterfly.

Musical style
The track was a departure in style and influenced by Graham Nash's visits to America. Nash wanted to take the band in a new direction which was resisted by other members of the band, and this led to his departure and move to the United States. It was released in the UK on the Parlophone label (R5637) and in the US on the Epic label (10234). While a critical success, the song was a commercial failure by the Hollies' standards, prompting them to write and record the more commercial song "Jennifer Eccles" for their next single.

Reception
Cash Box said  that it's "a crashing folk-drenched rock side with heavy push in the rhythm section and some fine group vocal work" that also has "stunning production."

Charts

Cover versions
Nash performed the song in his solo part of concerts with Crosby, Stills, Nash & Young, the band Nash joined after the Hollies, during their 1970 tours. It appears on the 1992 reissue of their album 4 Way Street.
DCL Locomotive, a spinoff of the post-punk band The Cravats, released their version of the song as a 12" single in 1984.
The Posies covered the song in 1995 for the tribute album Sing Hollies in Reverse.

In film 
The song features in The Limey, when Peter Fonda's character, an ageing record producer, is introduced.

References

1967 songs
The Hollies songs
Parlophone singles
Songs written by Graham Nash
Songs written by Allan Clarke (singer)
Songs written by Tony Hicks